Germán Alejandro Garmendia Aranis (born April 25, 1990) is a Chilean YouTuber, singer-songwriter, comedian and writer. He became famous for his YouTube channel HolaSoyGerman, in which he uploaded humorous videos about everyday situations. He was once the second-most subscribed Youtube channel only behind PewDiePie from 2015 to 2017. His other YouTube channel with the most subscribers is his gameplay channel, JuegaGerman. It is the second-most subscribed channel in the Spanish language, behind Argentine channel El Reino Infantil. He is the most-subscribed YouTuber in Chile.

In 2016 he became the first YouTuber to receive two Diamond Plaques and outside his YouTube career, he formed a musical career with bands like Zudex, Feeling Every Sunset and Ancud, he also released several songs in his solo career. In April 2016, he released his first book, #ChupaElPerro. Another book, Di Hola, was released in 2018. German has received praise for his YouTube channels. In the MTV Millennial Awards, he won the Digital Icon and Master Gamer categories in 2014 and 2016, respectively. German was listed as one of the biggest YouTube stars by The Washington Post, one of the most popular by BBC, and one of the most influential in Time magazine.

Early life
Germán Alejandro Garmendia Aranis was born on April 25, 1990, in Copiapó, Chile, and lived there until he was 12 years old. When he was three, his father, Germán Luis Garmendia, died in a car crash on Christmas Eve. After the death of his father, Garmendia, his mother Cecilia del Carmen Aranis, and his brother Diego Garmendia, traveled across the country until they settled in Los Vilos, a coastal city located to the north of Santiago, where he lived much of his adolescenct life. In that town he met his first love, to whom he dedicated a song called "Para Ti". He had originally planned to study civil engineering, however never carried it out.

Garmendia and his brother formed a Pop Punk band called Zudex with some of his friends when he was 13. In addition, he started uploading videos of his band to YouTube since 2006. German, who was the lead singer of the group, made several presentations in youth festivals and schools together with Diego and in the early 2010s, he performed as the vocalist of his new group Feeling Every Sunset.

Career

Internet career
On September 9, 2011, he uploaded his first video on HolaSoyGerman channel titled Las cosas obvias de la vida (lit. "The obvious things in life"). The videos on the channel consisted of humorous monologues talking about everyday life situations. In an interview with BBC Mundo, Garmendia stated that "The humor I do on YouTube is quite innocent. I've always liked making people laugh by making fun of myself, never of others." In 2013, Garmendia created another YouTube channel called JuegaGerman, where he mainly uploads gameplay videos and other content. 

A Spanish YouTuber named YoLordestructor uploaded a video accusing him of using bots to artificially boost his subs. He cite a deleted video from HolaSoyGerman, Internet y Redes Sociales,in which it displayed various websites marked as AddSocials, YouLikeHits and SocialClump, which are allegedly for using bots. Days later, he uploaded another video in which he accused Germán of having deleted his previous video due to copyright claims. Subsequently, other youtubers such as the Mexican Diego Mexivergas or the Chilean Xodaaa uploaded videos supporting these accusations as true.

On August 24, 2013, German responded in a video to these allegations, stating that they were false. On August 28, he accumulated more than four million views and was subsequently removed. That same year he uploaded the most popular video on his channel HolaSoyGerman and one of the most Chilean viral videos entitled Los Hermanos (The Brothers). In August 2014, he won the "Digital Icon" category from MTV Millennial Awards, in which the "maximum representative of the Latin American culture that consumes Twitter, YouTube and Instagram" is chosen.

In April 2014, Garmendia was scheduled to appear at the Telmex Aldea Digital in Zócalo, Mexico City. The event experienced an unplanned excess of attendees and many people were waiting in line to see him, but they passed out from exposure to the heat. In addition, four children were lost and later they will be delivered to their parents. The crowd began to push as they tried to enter the tent where the event was taking place. 13 people were injured when one of the installed pavilions fell on top of them, three were transferred to different hospitals for their attention, since one was pregnant. After security regained control of the situation, the crowd dispersed and the Garmendia event was cancelled. He later expressed his condolences to his fans for the incident via Twitter.

In October 2015, Jack Black appeared in a video titled Tipos de alumnos to publicize the movie Goosebumps. In March 2016, the Canadian rock band, Simple Plan, participated in the opening of La Comida. In June 2016, Garmendia won the category "Master Gamer" from MTV Millennial Awards, at the Pepsi Center WTC in Mexico City. In addition, he received he received two Diamond plates for reaching 10 million subscribers on its two main channels HolaSoyGerman and JuegaGerman, being the first YouTuber to receive them. 

On November 20, 2016, Garmendia uploaded the last HolaSoyGerman video, Como Encontrar Trabajo. By 2018, he was the fourth most followed youtuber in the world, in a JuegaGerman video titled Esto pasa si busco mi nombre en YouTube, he explained that the reason why he stopped uploading videos to HolaSoyGerman was due to the time and wear and tear that creating each video on that channel meant, some of these it took 22 hours. This statement was in response to a Spanish YouTuber who accused him of taking drugs to make his videos. In August 2018, he won in the Favorite Gamer category of the Kids' Choice Awards Mexico, held in the national auditorium of Mexico City. In 2019, his channel HolaSoyGerman, which until then had 37 million, was in a confrontation for being the Spanish-speaking channel with the most subscribers worldwide with the Mexican company Badabun. That same year, Badabun surpassed him in subscribers, however with time he ended up overcoming it.

In September 2018, the Facebook page Uah published a two-minute fragment from a JuegaGerman video, Oh Por Dios Soy Emo, in which Garmendia said "things that a woman never has to do: dress in a miniskirt and go out to a bar, one; go alone, two; play pool where she obviously always lifts her butt and men obviously get horny." The clip became viral through social networks. Several days later, Garmendia uploaded a video entitled An apology and a reflection to continue advancing in which he apologized for comments made in the 2014 video. On September 28, Alex Christiansen criticized the video, affirming that "continues to the letter all the apologies of YouTubers, who have already seen figures such as PewDiePie and Logan Paul". In August 2020 he was nominated in the Favorite Gamer category of the Kids' Choice Awards Mexico, however in November won The Donato. In October 2021, he won the Leyend Award at the Eliot Awards, due to his long career on YouTube. In 2022, he was nomitated to the Chilean Celibrity category in the Mexico Kids' Choice Awards.

Writing career 
On April 5, 2016, Garmendia uploaded a promotional video of his book #ChupaElPerro: Uno que otro consejo. He later toured Latin America to promote his book, and he presented it on April 23 at the Bogotá book fair. It was not officially released until April 28 by Penguin Random House.

In his visit to the Buenos Aires book fair held on May 7, 2016, Garmendia signed 3,000 copies of his book in ten hours and sold 8,000 copies. On May 16, 2016, it was the best-selling Chilean non-fiction book. On June 11, 2016, he made a promotional visit in Bicentennial Park, Mexico.

In December 2017, Garmendia announced he would write a second book and in the second half of 2018 he signed a contract with Planeta Group. In September 2018, he announced the release of his second book, Di Hola. It was released on October 9, 2018, in Ibero-America and later in Lima, Peru, and Bogotá, Colombia.

Music career 
Garmendia was a vocalist for the band Ancud. On April 5, 2016, the band released a four-track EP, Así es Normal. On November 22, 2016, Garmendia posted on his band's official account the music video for "Cambia", a song with the sound of "quite soft guitars and melodies with German on the microphone."  In a tweet made on November 12, 2016, Garmendia announced that he would be present at the third Club Media Fest that would be held on December 10 of that year, in Club de Gimnasia y Esgrima de Buenos Aires.

In April 2017, they released their first studio album, Se hacen realidad. On November 4, 2017, they performed a concert at the Caupolicán Theatre as part of the Se Hacen Realidad Tour. In La Tercera, Paul Quinteros criticized the 40,000 pesos sum offered by the event to be able to enter, he also affirmed that this "is a capital impudence that makes it clear that when you can steal, (and obviously I do not mean the literal sense of the word) he's going to try to steal as much as possible."

In March 2017, Ancud was nominated in Best South Artist and Revelation Artist categories in the third edition of the Heat Latin Music Awards. "Plan B" was released in September 2020, reach the 123 position in the Puerto Rican charts. At the end of December 2021, he announced the release of his new song, "Titán". It was released on January 6, 2022, on his YouTube music account and Spotify profile, reaching number six in the Chilean charts for four weeks.

Other works 
In August 2014, Garmendia uploaded in HolaSoyGerman, Agua para Africa, in which he shows support for a non-profit campaign known as My Charity Water, whose main objective was to raise $100,000, however in September of that year $72,000 was raised. In June 2015, he was the protagonist in an advertisement for the Mexican snack brand Crujitos. In 2016 he dubbed Julian's voice in Ice Age: Collision Course in Latin Spanish, whose character was described by Garmendia himself as "loud and scandalous".

Garmendia attended the Rio de Janeiro 2016 Olympic Games, running for more than 200 meters holding the Olympic flame at Foz do Iguaçu, before passing it to Calu Rivero. The inclusion of both Garmendia and Rivero in the 2016 Olympic Games generated quite a bit of controversy, and also received a lot of criticism, Chilean digital newspaper El Dínamo questioned the inclusion of Garmendia in said tour, wondering if "there was no one else in Chile." In January 2017, he and the developer HsG Games published German Quest, a video game for Android that obtained more than 17,000 downloads after its launch.

In March 2017, Garmendia and his brother went to the Chiloe, Ancud, commune to support the "Let's save the seas from the end of the world" initiative, whose objective was to protect the southern seas of Chile. Since April 9, 2018, he was Chilean ambassador of the Make-A-Wish Foundation. In December 2021, he made an appearance in the Digital Table of the Teletón, in which he donated 30,000,000 Chilean pesos on behalf of the Antofagasta region. In the same month, he returned to Chile after his stay in the city of Los Angeles, United States and participated in an episode of the show Socios de la Hamburguesa, directed by Pancho Saavedra. In it he talked so much with Saavedra, Jorge Zabaleta and Pedro Ruminot, the latter affirmed that he contacted German so that he would appear in an old CHV program, El club de comedia.

Personal life
After the success he achieved with his HolaSoyGerman channel in 2013, he decided to live in the Mexico City, in June of that year, he moved to Los Angeles. He was a vegetarian for ethical reasons from 2015 to 2017. In 2015, he ended his relationship with Mexican celebrity Allison Smith and returned to Chile. On May 29, 2016, he uploaded a video entitled Mi novia, he revealed his relationship with Lenay Chantelle Olsen, also known as Lele.

In a video from November 21, 2016, titled Mi Historia de Bullying, he spoke about the bullying that he suffered because of his thinness. In March 2017, during his stay in Chile, Garmendia uploaded the video This has to stop... please, in which he talks about all the harassment he and Olsen had received from some fans.

Public image 
On 12 April 2013, Garmendia was listed in a New York Times article, and on July 23, 2015, he was chosen as the second YouTube's biggest star from the Washington Post, and stating that he had won 1.3 million. He denied being a millionaire in an exclusive interview with the Special Report program: "People rely a lot on the CPM in the United States, which is the cost per thousand visits, something that we don't have. If in the United States United States and United Kingdom is 14 dollars, we have 0.5 dollars."

In December 2016, Garmendia was listed as one of the highest-paid YouTube stars by Forbes, stating that he earned 5.5 million and being the only Latin American YouTuber on the list. In January 2018, the BBC chose him as the second most popular YouTuber, and in June 2018, Wired highlighted his aspirations to act, write, and direct in Hollywood since he moved to Los Angeles for the second time in 2017. On July 16, 2019, Garmendia was listed as one of the 25 Most Influential People on the Internet by Time. In September 2020, the Monitor Information Agency listed him as one of the most profitable vloggers.

Awards and nominations

Filmography

Discography

Studio albums and EPs 
2006: Hecho en Casa (EP as Zudex)
2007: Punto De Partida (EP as Zudex)
2008: Mil Sueño (EP as Zudex)
2009: Rande Rande (EP as Zudex)
2011: Homemade (EP as German Garmendia)
2011: Die Trying (EP as Feeling Every Sunset)
2014: Cuando Desees Recordar Mi Voz (EP as Feeling Every Sunset)
2016: Así Es Normal (EP as Ancud)
2017: Se Hacen Realidad (Studio album as Ancud)

 Singles 

 Works 
 (2016) #ChupaElPerro. Penguin Random House. . 
 (2018) Di Hola.'' Planeta. .

See also
List of YouTubers

Notes

References

External links
 HolaSoyGerman on YouTube
 JuegaGerman on YouTube
 German Garmendia on Facebook
 GermanGarmendia on Twitter
 GermanGarmendia on Instagram
 German Garmendia at IMDb
 German Garmendia at Discogs

1990 births
Living people
People from Copiapó Province
Spanish-language YouTubers
Gaming YouTubers
Comedy YouTubers
YouTube vloggers
Chilean YouTubers
Chilean male comedians
21st-century Chilean male singers
Chilean pop singers
Chilean rock singers
Streamy Award winners
YouTube channels launched in 2006